Larz may refer to:
 Lärz, a municipality in Germany
 Larz, a given name; people with the name include:
 Larz Anderson (1866–1937), American diplomat
 Larz Bourne (1916–1993), American cartoon writer